Moca zophodes is a moth in the family Immidae. It was described by Edward Meyrick in 1909. It is found in Bolivia.

The wingspan is 16–17 mm. The forewings are rather dark fuscous, slightly and irregularly whitish sprinkled and with a small white discal dot at three-fifths and a dark fuscous terminal line. The hindwings are rather dark fuscous.

References

Moths described in 1909
Immidae
Taxa named by Edward Meyrick
Moths of South America